Yury Shamayev (Russian: Юрий Шамаев; born 15 April 1947) is a Soviet rower. He competed at the 1972 Summer Olympics in Munich with the men's coxed four where they came fourth.

References

1947 births
Living people
Soviet male rowers
Olympic rowers of the Soviet Union
Rowers at the 1972 Summer Olympics